Jenő Paprika (born 5 January 1960) is a Hungarian gymnast. He competed in eight events at the 1988 Summer Olympics.

References

External links
 

1960 births
Living people
Hungarian male artistic gymnasts
Olympic gymnasts of Hungary
Gymnasts at the 1988 Summer Olympics
People from Kiskunhalas
Sportspeople from Bács-Kiskun County